Tripudia dimidata is a moth in the family Noctuidae (the owlet moths) first described by Smith in 1905.

The MONA or Hodges number for Tripudia dimidata is 9007.

References

Further reading

External links
 

Eustrotiinae
Articles created by Qbugbot
Moths described in 1905